Rabenau is a town in the Sächsische Schweiz-Osterzgebirge district, in the Free State of Saxony, Germany.

Personality 
 Karl von Miltitz (1490-1529), papal nuncio
 Cornelius Schnauber (1939-2014), literary critic, author, grew up in Rabenau
 Hans-Jürgen Kreische (born 1947), soccer player of the GDR, grew up in Rabenau
 Daniel Rosin (born 1980), professional football player, grew up in Rabenau

List of mayors 
This list contains the democratically elected mayors since 1990

 1990-1994: Frank Schoenherr (CDU)
 1994-2008: Gerd Hilbert (FDP)
 2009: Thomas Paul (CDU)

References